The Saudi Federation For Cybersecurity, Programming and Drones (SAFCSP) is a national institution in Saudi Arabia aiming at developing professional skills in the fields of cybersecurity and programming.

Structure 
SAFCSP is associated with the Saudi Arabian Olympic Committee and governed by the board of directors that is chaired by Faisal Al-Khamisi.

Hajj Hackathon 
In 2018, SAFCSP organized the Hajj Hackathon event in Jeddah, west of Saudi Arabia, with 2,950 participants from over 100 countries. With this number of participants, SAFCSP broke the Guinness World Record for 'Most participants in a hackathon'.

Bug Bounty 
In 2019, SAFCSP has introduced Bug Bounty, a rewards platform that aims at exploiting the capabilities of individual talents and research to detect and discover vulnerabilities in software and websites of organizations.

References 



Government agencies of Saudi Arabia
Hackathons
Guinness World Records
2017 establishments in Saudi Arabia
Sports governing bodies in Saudi Arabia